Bernardas Fridmanas or Bernard Naftal Friedman (1 October 1859 in Panevėžys, Russian Empire – 22 October 1939) was a Lithuanian Jewish lawyer, judge, journalist, politician and an activist of the Jewish minority. He served as the Minister of Jewish Affairs for Lithuania in 1923.

Biography 
In 1878–1886, he worked as a court clerk at the magistrate of Šiauliai, then up to the First World War, he practiced as a lawyer in Biržai and Panevėžys. After the war, he served as a justice of the peace in Biržai and Utena.

In independent Lithuania, he became a judge of the district court in Kaunas in 1925 served a similar function in Panevėžys. From February to June 1923, he was the Minister of Jewish Affairs in the government of Prime Minister Ernestas Galvanauskas.

References

External links 
 Biography info (lt)

1859 births
1939 deaths
Lithuanian Jews
Lithuanian journalists
19th-century Lithuanian lawyers
Lithuanian activists
Minister for Jewish Affairs of Lithuania
People from Panevėžys
Jews from the Russian Empire
20th-century Lithuanian lawyers